Nacoleia junctithyralis is a moth in the family Crambidae. It was described by George Hampson in 1898. It is found in Papua New Guinea, where it has been recorded from the D'Entrecasteaux Islands (Fergusson Island).

References

Moths described in 1898
Nacoleia
Moths of New Guinea